Horror films released in the 2000s are listed in the following articles:
 List of horror films of 2000
 List of horror films of 2001
 List of horror films of 2002
 List of horror films of 2003
 List of horror films of 2004
 List of horror films of 2005
 List of horror films of 2006
 List of horror films of 2007
 List of horror films of 2008
 List of horror films of 2009

2000s
Horror